Highway 21 is a highway in the Canadian province of Saskatchewan. It runs from Montana Secondary Highway 233 at the United States border near Willow Creek to Highway 950/Highway 919 within the Meadow Lake Provincial Park.

Highway 21 passes through the major communities of Maple Creek, Kindersley, Kerrobert, and Unity. Highway 21 intersects three major western Saskatchewan highways: Highway 1, Highway 7, and Highway 16.

Highway 21 has average annual daily traffic (AADT) of 500 vehicles a day and truck traffic is 30% of this total. Unity has two inland grain terminals. The oil and gas industry is also active in this area.

History
The original Provincial Highway 21 is between Highway 13 west of Robsart and Leader. It originally continued west from Leader to Estuary and Empress, Alberta, before it turned north and followed Range Road 3293, adjacent to the Alberta-Saskatchewan border. It followed a series of country roads through Loverna, Macklin, and Lloydminster to Onion Lake. In the 1930s, the Leader-Empress section was renumbered to Highway 32 while the Empress-Onion Lake was renumbered to Highway 17 (the section south of Macklin was later decommissioned).

At the same time, Provincial Highway 30 ran from Lemsford, through Glidden and Kindersley, to Kerrobert; the section between Lemsford and Glidden was decommissioned in the 1940s. In the 1960s, Highway 330 was commissioned between Kerrobert, through Unity, to Highway 40 west of Cut Knife. Provincial Highway 48 ran between Govenlock and Willow Creek; however in the 1960s, it was renumbered to Highway 348.

In 1971, the Chesterfield Bridge across the South Saskatchewan River was opened, extending Highway 21 to Eatonia. Bridges were opened across the Battle and North Saskatchewan Rivers were opened later in the decade, and along with the renumbering Highways 348, 30, and 330, Highway 21 assumed its present length.

Major intersections
From south to north:

Footnotes

References

021